Igor Polovets (born March 28, 1969, Moscow) is a Russian businessman and investor. Igor Polovets is the owner of the RPI Group of Companies, including RPI International and RPI Eastern Europe.

Business
Igor and his companies have advised most major Russian and international oil and gas companies on investment opportunities in the former Soviet Union. RPI Group of Companies specializes in advising companies on mergers and acquisitions in the oil and gas sector of the former Soviet Union. The key focus of RPI Eastern Europe’s activities is the consulting and analytical support to operations of oil and gas companies. RPI International carries out strategic communication projects, and organizes and holds major oil and gas conferences and business forums. Igor and RPI were involved in many major transactions, including the merger of TNK and BP in Russia, as well as the subsequent sale of TNK-BP to Russian national oil company, Rosneft.

Philanthropy
Igor's charity projects including providing administrative and technical assistance to Hesegi Karmiel (Israel) children’s sports school in Israel with an emphasis on table tennis, by financing purchases of children’s sports uniforms and equipment. Igor has also provided financial aid to students at the Nursing Department of The Max Stern Yezreel Valley College.  Igor supports activities of the Lichnoe Uchastie Foundation, which helps children suffering from oncological diseases.

References 

1969 births
Living people
Businesspeople from Moscow